Sanjaya Lall (13 December 1940 – 18 June 2005) was a development economist and Professor of Economics at the University of Oxford. Lall's research interests included the impact of foreign direct investment in developing countries, the economics of multi-national corporations, and the development of technological capability and industrial competitiveness in developing countries. One of the world's pre-eminent development economists, Lall was also one of the founding editors of the journal Oxford Development Studies and a senior economist at the World Bank (1965–68 and 1985–87).

Biography

Lall was born in Patna, Bihar, India, and graduated from Patna University in 1960 with a BA in economics, receiving the Gold Medal for ranking first in the university. He then read for a degree in Philosophy, Politics, and Economics at St. John's College, Oxford University, graduating with first class honours in 1963. Lall subsequently achieved a distinction in the MPhil in economics at Oxford in 1965. Lall is the grandson of the prominent Indian historian K.P. Jayaswal, and the brother-in-law of Cambridge economist Ajit Singh.

Lall's career began working as an economist at the World Bank (1965–68). Apart from a two-year return to the bank in the mid-1980s, Oxford remained his home, where he served first as Junior, then as Senior, Research Officer at the Institute of Economics and Statistics for over 30 years; as a University Lecturer in Development Economics at Queen Elizabeth House; as a Fellow of Green College since 1982; and as Professor of Development Economics since 1999. In addition, he was course director of Development Studies at Oxford and one of the founding editors of the journal Oxford Development Studies. He was one of the most productive economists at the university, writing or co-authoring 33 books between 1975 and 2003, publishing 75 listed articles in reputable refereed professional journals, 72 chapters in books,  67 reports for international agencies or governments, and another 27 articles. He also acted as adviser or consultant to a wide spectrum of governments and international development organisations, from the World Bank, UNICEF and the OECD to the European Commission and the Commonwealth Secretariat; he served as the Principal Consultant to UNCTAD (the United Nations Conference on Trade and Development) on its World Investment Report, and to UNIDO (the United Nations Industrial Development Organization) on its Industrial Development Report.

Academic contributions
Lall made contributions to development economics in three major areas. The first of these came early in the form of pioneering work on transfer pricing by multinational enterprises, based especially on an empirical investigation of corporations operating in the pharmaceutical industry. It showed basically how multinationals could use intra-firm pricing and accounting mechanisms to siphon out, or invisibly repatriate, profits from their overseas enterprises. This was accompanied by extensive work on the role of foreign investment and multinationals in developing economies, done in part in collaboration with one of his early mentors, Paul Streeten. Lall's fascination with India and the Indian economy led to his opening up a related, highly significant field of work - the phenomenon of Third World multinationals, and developing countries as the exporters of technology.

A second interwoven strand of work was on the development of technological capability in developing countries. Technology has generally mystified economists, and in turn, and true to their profession, economic theorists have tended to mystify technology. Lall stands in a fine line of thinkers who have challenged the black-box, reductionist view of technology in economic theorising. In its place, he attempted to develop over time the notion of the construction of technological capability, whether in an enterprise, in a firm, in an industry, or in an economy. He argued that, far from just "picking" industrial winners, the East Asian tiger economies had carefully and proactively "created" winners through the generation of technological capability and the acquisition of industrial competitiveness.

This feeds directly into a third group of ideas. How should the industrialist, or the policymaker, in a developing country set about generating technological capability and industrial competitiveness? Lall's empirical work carefully scrutinised the validity of the ubiquitous assertions that unrestricted flows of foreign direct investment (FDI) through multinationals would lead to effective technology transfer into the manufacturing sectors of developing economies. Lall tends seriously to question the automaticity of any such benefit transfer; he shows, however, the relevance of an active state policy vis-à-vis the domestic manufacturing and technology sectors.

The importance of the role of the state in generating a successful path of competitive industrialisation was one of the continuous threads running through his work. He did not balk at taking on positions that were unpopular among the neo-liberal unfettered-globalisation school. Very early in his career, he wrote a paper which toyed critically with the notion of dependency. Ever since then, the issue of the viability of autonomous, not autarkic, industrialisation in Third World economies was for him a latent leitmotif. From start to finish, Lall remained a passionate, but scientifically rigorous, advocate of Third World industrial development.

The Sanjaya Lall Visiting Professorship in Development and Business
The Sanjaya Lall Visiting Professorship at the University of Oxford, created to honour Lall's academic legacy, has established itself as one of the most prestigious visiting appointments in economics. It has been held by the following scholars:

2011: Robert Wade 
2013: Dani Rodrik 
2014: Paul Krugman 
2015: Abhijit Banerjee 
2016: Avinash Dixit 
2017: Kenneth Rogoff 
2018: Esther Duflo 
2020: Joseph Stiglitz

The Visiting Professorship, which is associated with the Social Sciences Division and Green Templeton College, was launched on 3 June 2011. The inaugural event was a panel discussion involving Nobel Laureate Amartya Sen, Financial Times commentator Martin Wolf, and the first holder of the new Chair, Robert Wade of the London School of Economics. The event was opened by the Chancellor of Oxford University, Lord Chris Patten. Other speakers included Colin Mayer, Dean of the Said Business School, and Frances Stewart of Queen Elizabeth House.
The panellists began by evoking the memory of Sanjaya both as a friend and a pioneering development economist. Drawing on Sanjaya's intellectual legacy, they debated how emerging economies will shape the future of the global economy and the challenges they are likely to face. Professor Sen highlighted the considerable pressures Western democracies face from powerful banking institutions, and the lessons to be learned from emerging markets with more robust regulatory systems. Mr Wolf illustrated the rapid convergence of a small number of developing countries, led by China, with advanced economies. Professor Wade discussed the problems of global economic governance, arguing for radical reform of bodies such as the IMF and the G-20. The event attracted over 800 people, the largest ever turnout in the history of the Said Business School. A large number of distinguished academics from Oxford and beyond, as well as representatives from UNIDO, the World Bank, the IMF and other international organisations, attended the event.

Published works 
 
Reprinted as 
 
 
 
 
 
Reprinted in French as Les Multionationales Originaires du Tiers Monde, Paris: Press Universitaires de France, 1984; and in German as Multionationale Konzerne aus der Dritten Welt, Frankfurt: Campus Verlag, 1984.
 
 
  
Reprinted in French as Promouvir la Competitivite Industriells dans les Pays en Developpement, Paris: OECD, 1990.
 
 
 
 
 
Available online: Part 1 (pdf), part 2 (pdf), part 3 (pdf), part 4 (pdf) and part 5 (pdf).
 
 
 
 
 
 
 
 
 
 
Also available in Spanish: UN ECLAC, Santiago de Chile, serie desarrollo productivo number 88.

Notes

Further reading

 Singh, Ajit. "Tribute to Sanjaya Lall" (University of Cambridge, 19 January 2009) online

External links
  Official website of the Sanjaya Lall Memorial Fund
  Oxford University Faculty of Economics Profile
  Tribute to Sanjaya Lall by colleague
  Obituary in The Times, 7 July 2005

1940 births
2005 deaths
Fellows of Green Templeton College, Oxford
Alumni of St John's College, Oxford
Indian development economists
St. Xavier's Patna alumni
Scientists from Patna
20th-century Indian economists
Scholars from Bihar